Jean Kilbourne (born January 4, 1943) is an American public speaker, writer, filmmaker and activist, who is known for her work on the image of women in advertising and her critical studies of alcohol and tobacco advertising. She is also credited with introducing the idea of educating about media literacy as a way to prevent problems she viewed as originating from mass media advertising campaigns. She also lectures about the topic, and her documentaries (such as the Killing Us Softly series) based on these lectures are viewed around the world.

She is a graduate of Wellesley College and holds a doctorate in education from Boston University, as well as an honorary doctorate from Westfield State College, for her "research [and] insights [that] lead us from consumerism to consciousness."

Academics and career 
In the late 1960s, Jean Kilbourne began her exploration of the connection between advertising and several public health issues, including violence against women, eating disorders, and addiction, and launched a movement to promote media literacy as a way to prevent these problems. A radical and original idea at the time, this approach is now mainstream and an integral part of most prevention programs.

Kilbourne has spoken at about half of the colleges and universities in the U.S. She is frequently a keynote speaker at a wide range of conferences, including those focusing on addictions and public health, violence against women, and media literacy.

In 1993, Jean Kilbourne was appointed by the U.S. Secretary of Health and Human Services to the National Advisory Council on Alcohol Abuse and Alcoholism. She has been interviewed by many major news sources such as Time, Newsweek, and The New York Times, and has been featured on hundreds of television and radio programs including The Today Show, 20/20, All Things Considered, and The Oprah Winfrey Show.

In 2005, a Canadian all-female rock band paid tribute to Kilbourne by naming their band Kilbourne, the same year she was granted an honorary doctorate from Westfield State College.

In recent years, Kilbourne has been interviewed for Feminists Who Changed America 1963–1975 and included as a trading card for Media Heroes which "celebrate beloved media heroes" as a teaching tool with hand drawn art along with a short biography.

Activism 
In 1977, Kilbourne became an associate of the Women's Institute for Freedom of the Press (WIFP). WIFP is an American nonprofit publishing organization. The organization works to increase communication between women and connect the public with forms of women-based media.

Film works
Kilbourne's work links the power of images in the media with current public health problems, such as eating disorders, violence and drug and alcohol addiction. Through her lectures, films, and articles, many of her original ideas and concepts have become mainstream. These include the concepts of the tyranny of the beauty ideal, the connection between the objectification of women and violence, the themes of liberation and weight control exploited in tobacco advertising aimed at women, the targeting of alcoholics by the alcohol industry, addiction as a love affair, and many others.

Kilbourne has served as an advisor to the Surgeons General, and holds an honorary position as senior scholar at the Wellesley Centers for Women. She has also served as an advisor or board member to many organizations, including ACME (Action Coalition for Media Education), the Media Education Foundation, the National Council on Alcoholism and Drug Dependence, NEDA (the National Eating Disorders Association), and the National Sexual Violence Resource Center.

Documentaries

Complete filmography:
 Killing Us Softly 4: Advertising’s Image of Women (2010)
 Deadly Persuasion: Advertising & Addiction (2004)
 Spin the Bottle: Sex, Lies, & Alcohol (2004)
 Killing Us Softly 3: Advertising’s Image of Women (2000)
 The End of Education (with Neil Postman, 1996)
 Slim Hopes: Advertising & the Obsession with Thinness (1995)
 Sexual Harassment: Building Awareness on Campus (1995)
 The Killing Screens: Media and the Culture of Violence (with George Gerbner, hosted by Jean Kilbourne) (1994)
 Pack of Lies: The Advertising of Tobacco (1992)
 Advertising Alcohol: Calling the Shots (2nd Edition) (1991) (Red Ribbon, American Film and Video Festival)
 Still Killing Us Softly: Advertising’s Image of Women (1987) (National Council on Family Relations Film Festival, First Place; National Educational Film and Video Festival, Winner; Chicagoland Educational Film Festival, First Prize, Consumer Education)
 Calling the Shots: Advertising Alcohol (1982)
 Killing Us Softly: Advertising’s Image of Women (1979) (North American Consumer Film Festival, Winner)

Publications
 
 
Originally published as Deadly Persuasion by Simon & Schuster in 1999, won the Distinguished Publication Award from the Association for Women in Psychology.  She has written many articles, including editorials in The New York Times, USA Today and The Journal of the American Medical Women's Association, and has contributed chapters to many books.

Lectures
 So Sexy So Soon: The New Sexualized Childhood
 The Naked Truth: Advertising's Image of Women
 Deadly Persuasion: Advertising & Addiction
 Deadly Persuasion: Advertising & the Corruption of Relationships
 Pack of Lies: The Advertising of Tobacco
 You've Come the Wrong Way, Baby: Women & Smoking
 Marketing Misery: Selling Addictions to Women
 Slim Hopes: Advertising & the Obsession with Thinness
 Falling in Love with Food: Connection & Disconnection in Food Advertising
 Eating Our Hearts Out: Advertising & Obesity
 Under the Influence: The Advertising of Alcohol

Uses
Kilbourne's work has been cited and heavily discussed in academics, in both research journals and the classroom. In Tyson Smith's Pumping Irony: The Construction of Masculinity in a Post-feminist Advertising Campaign Kilbourne is cited for her statements on advertising alcohol in the article's section focusing on a campaign for Jim Beam bourbon, which sought to bring the young, white, middle-class heterosexual male. Though paraphrased, Smith references Kilbourne when critiquing the ad campaign, saying that alcohol consumption typically leads to addiction, and that alcohol brands aim to create a bond between the potential addict and the brand itself. The reasoning being that "the addict is the ideal customer" because "ten percent of drinkers consume over 60% of all alcohol sold." Kilbourne is further referenced in Smith's article, particularly about the link between drinking alcohol and the image of masculinity. The very concept of alcohol consumption is "seen as both rebellious and dangerous" and a rite of passage to become 'a real man.' Alcohol advertisements "walk a fine line between wildness and anti-social behavior" as Kilbourne said because ads typically depict personality changes in people after consumption, "normalizing" the change, and often associate the alcoholic product and defiance. The ad campaign itself, titled Real Friends, featured the 'everyday guy' such as the bar frequenter with text such as "If the chicks ask, we're watching the footy" rather than using the hyper-masculine image of men, yet reinforces the hyper-masculine stereotype since the men in the campaign are "assertive and defiant in the form of rejecting women's demands."

Following the same theme of advertising and its impact on gender, Kilbourne and some of her work, the Killing Us Softly series and Deadly Persuasion: Why Women and Girls Must Fight the Addictive Power of Advertising were used for Reaffirming the Ideal: A Focus Group Analysis of the Campaign for Real Beauty. Recalling Kilbourne's idea that advertisers would not spend the supposed billions of dollars on ad campaigns if consumers felt advertisements had no effect on them, which the relationship between advertisers and consumers is documented in her Killing Us Softly series, particularly with women's body image set as a standard by advertisers. Additionally, since the Unilever Dove Campaign for Real Beauty seeks to address the effects of beauty advertising on young girls' self-esteem and body image in an educational way, Kilbourne's series may have been an influence.

Noting that Kilbourne's Killing Us Softly series is an available educational source with supplemental materials for high school and college level courses, and the fact that one of the article's authors, Julie-Ann Scott, teaches at an institution where the series is part of the foundation for the Women's Studies program brings validity to Kilbourne's decades-long efforts exposing advertising's attitudes about how women should look if they want to be considered 'beautiful.'

In pop culture

In addition to lectures and being featured in her own documentaries, Kilbourne has been in the documentary Miss Representation about advertising's image of women, an expert at kidsinthehouse.com where she has a video series on parenting advice, and a guest on Katie Couric's talkshow Katie for an episode on deadly dangerous teen dieting trends that affect all genders and result in suicide, starvation, hospitalizations and substance abuse.

In 2020, Jean Kilbourne wrote for Ms Magazine with Jackson Katz criticism of Donald Trump in the toxic masculinity era. In 2019, she wrote a magazine article about her early work experience, when she was sexually harassed by Li'l Abner creator Al Capp and the event's lingering impact on her.

Criticism
While Kilbourne's work, specifically her Killing Us Softly documentary series, is often generally well-regarded for documenting the ways advertisements and the media shape women's perception of body and the standards they should hold themselves to, there has also been a backlash in the way the series itself is delivered.

In the 2006 article Market Feminism: The Case for a Paradigm Shift by Linda M. Scott, the Killing Us Softly series was criticized since the second entry, Still Killing Us Softly from 1987 was a near duplicate film from the 1979 original, so much so that she said "[Killing Us Softly] was casually reissued in almost identical form as Still Killing Us Softly. At the time, the third and most recent entry, Killing Us Softly 3 was called a "movie sequel" to further criticize the series. Additionally, Scott pointed out the cost to purchase or rent the films and the number of stickers warning that the content was under copyright protection if they were rented, claiming it "[seems] a profit motive is at work." There is no need for the films to have such warnings on them "if all Kilbourne wanted was to further 'the cause'" Scott wrote. Scott was deeply offended and felt personally targeted and replied to Kilbourne because in Scott's apparent perspective, "one might think it would be in the interests of the movement [feminism] if these tapes were copied and circulated as freely and widely as possible." Though Scott was so critical of Kilbourne's method of distribution, she agrees that "corporations that do include a feminist message in their ads are 'co-opting' the movement for private gain." Scott also notes that the reason for such prices on the films is because the target audience is not 'individual consumers' but university libraries, where women's studies programs are a definite audience that will consume such media.  After stating such, Scott points out the irony of the feminist speakers paid to speak to these audiences are "making money off women--by complaining about other people making money off women."

A roundtable of educators discussing their thoughts on teaching about advertising mentions Kilbourne and her documentaries. As many of the students in Robert Goldman's sociology classes at Lewis and Clark College are familiar with Kilbourne's series of films, he offers a criticism of Kilbourne's works as part of the midterm so students are thinking critically about what they saw. Jef Richards, a professor at the University of Texas at Austin, noted that previous arguments against Kilbourne's works were counter-argued in her then-recent (around 2003) works, presenting her material as 'better balanced,' yet moderator Linda Scott said 'Kilbourne is becoming your father's Oldsmobile when it comes to feminist critique',

A more contemporary criticism of Kilbourne comes from the 2012 Beyond Additions and Exceptions: The Category of Transgender and New Pedagogical Approaches for Women's Studies which calls for a change in teaching materials within Women's Studies courses since textbooks typically define women based on their anatomy, which excludes trans women, "[stabilizing] the normativity of hegemonic sex and gender embodiments by naturalizing nontransgender bodies."

Commenting on Killing Us Softly 3, the two authors point out Kilbourne's example of an ad that targeted women's breast sizes, damaging their self-esteem and her counter-example of ads that would point out the flaws of men’s penises. Though the authors profess that the counter-example is a good way for Kilbourne to demonstrate the way advertising looks at gender, they question the intent behind her joke as they wonder "what bodies (and body parts) are considered "women's" and "men's." Their issue with Kilbourne's critique, and others', is that "feminist analyses should also address the ways that gender is so unquestionably tied to particular bodies, and how analyses like Kilbourne's foreclose the possibility of transgender and gender-nonconforming bodies and subjects.” Additionally, the authors state that "by neglecting to acknowledge or critique dominant couplings of bodies and genders, Kilbourne is able to neatly flip the terms of the binary she sets up," and that "the absence of this critique is connected to her failure to interrogate the ways in which the category of women is constructed in conjunction with a host of other identity categories" such as race.

Awards and honors

She has twice received the Lecturer of the Year award from the National Association for Campus Activities and was once named one of the three most popular speakers on campuses by The New York Times Magazine. She was profiled in Feminists Who Changed America 1963–1975 and was one of twenty-one journalists, media activists, and educators included in Reclaim the Media's "Media Heroes" pack of trading cards. She received a most unusual tribute in 2004 when an all-female rock band in Canada named itself Kilbourne in her honor. While awarding Kilbourne the WIN (Women's Image Now) Award, the representative from the American Federation of Television and Radio Artists (AFTRA) said, “No one in the world has done more to improve the image of women in the media than Jean Kilbourne.” Mary Pipher, the author of Reviving Ophelia, has called Kilbourne “our best, most compassionate teacher.”

 Academy for Eating Disorders, Special Recognition Award, 2000
 ACME (Action Coalition for Media Education) Media Activist National Award, 2006
 AFTRA (American Federation of Television and Radio Artists), WIN (Women's Image Now) Award, 1995
 Association for Women in Psychology, Distinguished Publication Award, 2000 (For Can't Buy My Love: How Advertising Changes the Way We Think and Feel)
 Boston University School of Education, Ida M. Johnston Award, 2009
 Common Sense Media, Common Sense Media Award, 2011
 Educational Foundation of America (Grant for a study of gender stereotypes in television commercials), 1980
 Entertainment Industries Council, Special Commendation, 1990
 Feminists Who Changed America 1963–1975 (Profiled in the book)
 Healthy MEdia Commission for Positive Images of Women and Girls, 2010–2012
 LAMP (Learning About Multimedia Project) Amplifier Award, 2012
 Germaine Lawrence, Inc., Woman of Excellence award, 2005 Kansas City, Kansas (Given keys to the city by Mayor Kay Barnes), 2004
 MEDA (Multiservice Eating Disorders Association), Annual Award, 2007
 Miss Hall's School, Woman of Distinction Award, 2007
 Myra Sadker Equity Award, 2005
 National Association for Campus Activities, Lecturer of the Year Award (1988 and 1989)
 National Council on Alcoholism and Drug Dependence, Marty Mann Founder's Award, 1998
 National Eating Disorders Association Ambassador, 2011–present
 National Eating Disorders Association, Profiles in Living Award, 2010
 National Organization for Women, Boston chapter, Woman of the Year, 1982
 National Organization for Women, MA, Wonder Woman Award, 2010
 National Sexual Violence Resource Center (NSVRC), National Honorary Board, 2003–present
 National Women's Hall of Fame induction, 2015
 New Agenda, The, Pioneer Mentor, 2011
 Non-Smokers' Rights Association, Canada, Award of Merit, 1993
 PCAR (Pennsylvania Coalition Against Rape)/NSVRC (National Sexual Violence Resource Center), Lifetime Television's Times Square Project award, 2003
 Planned Parenthood of Connecticut, Hilda Crosby Standish Leadership Award, 2005
 Reclaim the Media (Included as one of twenty-one journalists, media activists, and educators in their "Media Heroes" deck of trading cards), 2008
 Stop Teenage Addiction to Tobacco (STAT), Annual Award
 Wellsley Centers for Women, senior scholar, 2008–present; visiting research scholar, 1984-2008
 Westfield State College, honorary doctorate, 2004
 Womanspace, Barbara Boggs Sigmund Award, 2008
 Women's Action Alliance, Leadership in Action Award, 1995

References

External links
 Jean Kilbourne biography on her official website
 So Sexy So Soon website
 Action Coalition for Media Education
 Wellesley Centers for Women
 
 Review of "Killing Us Softly"
 
 Wellesley College Alumnae Achievement Awards biography

1943 births
Living people
American educators
American feminist writers
Feminist studies scholars
Wellesley College alumni
Boston University School of Education alumni
Postmodern feminists